Atractaspis battersbyi, also known commonly as Battersby's burrowing asp and Battersby's mole viper, is a species of venomous snake in the family Atractaspididae. The species is native to Central Africa.

Etymology
Both common names and the specific epithet, battersbyi, are in honor of James Clarence Battersby (1901–1993), herpetologist at the British Museum (Natural History) for 46 years.

Geographic range
A. battersbyi is endemic to Africa. It is found in the Central African countries of Congo and Democratic Republic of Congo.

Reproduction
A. battersbyi is oviparous.

References

Further reading
de Witte GF (1959). "Contribution à la faune herpétologique du Congo Belge. Description de trois serpents nouveaux ". Revue de zoologie et de botanique africaines 50 (3/4): 348–351. (Atractaspis battersbyi, new species, p. 350). (in French).

Atractaspididae
Reptiles described in 1959